William Romain may refer to:
 William Romain (archaeologist) (William Francis Romain), American archaeologist, archaeoastronomer, and author
 William Francis Romain (politician), Canadian businessman and politician

See also
 William Romaine, evangelical divine of the Church of England